The Calgary–South Edmonton train, at times the Calgary–Edmonton train, was a Canadian passenger train service between Alberta's two most populous cities: Calgary and Edmonton. Intermediate stops along the corridor were in Didsbury, Olds, Innisfail, Red Deer, and Wetaskiwin. Rail service was replaced with buses in 1985.

History

In 1891, the Calgary and Edmonton Railway completed a rail line from Calgary to "South Edmonton", an area south of Edmonton across the North Saskatchewan River. The trip initially took around 12 hours.

In 1899, South Edmonton was incorporated as the Town of Strathcona. This town was merged into Edmonton in 1912, becoming the Strathcona neighborhood.

On January 8, 1904, the Canadian Pacific Railway acquired control of the Calgary and Edmonton Railway. To better compete with the Canadian Northern Railway, the CP built the High Level Bridge over the North Saskatchewan River and extended service to the downtown Edmonton station on September 2, 1913. This lasted until October 29, 1972, when service was cut back to again terminate at Strathcona station.

In 1978, Via Rail assumed operation of the route alongside the rest of Canadian Pacific's passenger trains. Under Via, the train ran from Tower Centre in Calgary through Red Deer to Strathcona in Edmonton. Timetables listed the latter stop as "South Edmonton" to distinguish it from the downtown Edmonton station built by the Canadian National Railway. Service consisted of two daily round trips, taking about 3 hours 10 minutes to traverse the  route.

On October 27, 1985, the train was discontinued and replaced with motorcoach bus service via Alberta Highway 2.

Proposed restoration

References

Railway services discontinued in 1985
Former Via Rail routes
Passenger rail transport in Alberta